Ambleville may refer to:

 Ambleville, Charente, a commune of the Charente département in France
 Ambleville, Val-d'Oise, a commune of the Val-d'Oise département in France